The Supermarine Aircraft Spitfire is an American homebuilt aircraft produced in kit form by Supermarine Aircraft. A replica of the famous British Supermarine Spitfire World War II fighter, it was originally produced to 75% scale. Subsequent models have increased the scale of the fuselage and added a second seat.

Design and development
Australian pilot and aviation engineer Mike O'Sullivan had always wanted a Spitfire and built a replica for his own use in 1991. The next year, in 1995, he joined with business partner John McCarron to form the Supermarine Aircraft company and produce all-Australian homebuild aircraft kits. In the event, the constant-speed, four-blade propeller would be obtained from a specialist firm in New Zealand. Supermarine Aircraft is not related to the original British Supermarine company, although the owners of the Supermarine marque have given their permission for the name to be used.

The first production model was named the Spitfire Mk25 and was a 75% scale replica of the original Supermarine Spitfire design. The stressed skin structure consists of 2024 aluminium alloy skins, formers and longerons with some fibre-glass mouldings for parts such as fairings and air scoops. The design features electrically-operated retractable undercarriage, with differential braking to the main wheels, and landing flaps.

The later Spitfire MK26 uses the MK25 wings with the fuselage increased to 80% scale to provide room for a passenger seat in tandem behind the pilot. The Mk26B has a 90% scale fuselage. The Spitfire kit has the same power-to-weight ratio as the original.

The aircraft was reviewed by the Australian Ultralight Federation in 2001.  It was approved as meeting Australian rules for kit-built aircraft.  Supermarine began promoting the kit plane to the US market in 2004.
The aircraft has been approved by the British Light Aircraft Association.

The company has since moved to Cisco Airport, Texas with its head office in nearby Clyde. which O'Sullivan also manages.Supermarine

Powerplant
The prototype MK25 was initially fitted with a Rotax engine, before development progressed through a series of more powerful Jabiru types. Early production models were powered by eight-cylinder,  Jabiru engines made in Australia. Subsequently, the company introduced a V6 Isuzu engine conversion, producing  with supercharger, as well as a V8 General Motors automotive engine conversion producing .

Early versions of the Spitfire MK26 used an eight-cylinder  Jabiru 5100 horizontally opposed aero engine, but early installations suffered from inadequate cooling. The company now offers a V6 engine.

The maximum rpm of a propeller (at about 2800 depending on its diameter) is about half that at the maximum torque/power rpm of about 5500 rpm for a car engine, which therefore must be fitted with a drive reduction unit. Such units absorb about 20% of the engine power and therefore the normally aspirated Isuzu unit delivers the same maximum power as the Jabiru 5100. Recent developments of the Jabiru engine range by Rotec have produced replacement water-cooled cylinder heads for the 5100. This has removed the overheating problems and also allowed the nose cowling of the Mk26 to be reshaped to remove the air intake and considerably reduce the frontal area to be in keeping with the original sleek design of the Spitfire.

Variants

MK25
Single-seat version, no longer produced, 75% scale. This was a true 'three-quarter' scale size of the original World War Two Mk 5 Spitfire.
MK26
Two-seat version. '80% scale'. Discontinued by 2011 in favor of the '90%' version. The '80% scale' refers only to the fuselage that was lengthened to 80% of the original MK5 Spitfire. The same wing was used from the 75% scale aircraft, resulting in a wingspan and undercarriage height identical to the original 75% scale aircraft.

MK26b
Improved MK26. Option of dual controls, '90% scale'. Again the '90% scale' refers only to the fuselage, that was again lengthened (in fact to 89.5% the length of the original MK5 Spitfire); the fuselage was also made fatter in the cockpit area. The same wing was used from the 75% scale aircraft, resulting in a wingspan and undercarriage height identical to the original 75% scale aircraft.

Construction
Construction of the Spitfire requires metalworking skills and tools and makes extensive use of aviation grade pull rivets or pop rivets. Pre-assembled kits are provided but still leave the builder with 1,200 man-hours of work to be completed.

Operational history
Over 92 Spitfires have now been sold around the world.

Fatal accidents/controversy

After a fatal accident at Gympie, Australia, in October 2010, involving a Mk 26, the coroner reported, on December 29, 2014. The inquest concluded that Michael O’Sullivan, the CEO of Supermarine Pty Ltd, admitted that the aircraft test flight period had only been 20 hours instead of the 37.5 hours declared, that he had "knowingly falsified documents to achieve registration of his aircraft with RA-Aus (Recreational Aviation Australia), rather than the more stringent registration with CASA (Civil Aviation Safety Authority)", and he admitted to "significantly understating the weight of the aircraft (by about 200kg)" (around half of the aircraft's stated empty weight of 401 kg).

In 2013, A MK26 80% scale Spitfire crashed in Adelaide, Australia. The pilot, as the only passenger in the aircraft, died as a result of the accident. Official findings show pilot error as the main contributor of the accident, however, the ATSB report stated: "The aircraft was prone to aerodynamically stall with little or no aerodynamic precursors and it was not fitted with a stall warning device, increasing the risk of inadvertent stall."

Specifications (MK26b)

See also

References

External links

Supermarine Aircraft web site.
Spitfire MK26, Pilotfriend.com
Image of Spitfire MK26, pbase.com
 Supermarine Spitfire Mk 26b, retrothing.com

1990s Australian sport aircraft
Homebuilt aircraft
Supermarine Spitfire replicas
Single-engined tractor aircraft
Low-wing aircraft
Aircraft first flown in 1994